The B Team is a non-profit organisation founded by Richard Branson and Jochen Zeitz to "make business work better".

The B Team may also refer to:

The B Team (TV series), an Australian television comedy
The B Team with Peter Berner, an Australian current affairs and commentary program on Sky News Live from 2016 to 2017
The B-Team, a WWE tag team featuring Bo Dallas and Curtis Axel from 2017 to 2020

See also
:Category:National B association football teams